Agostino Chiodo (16 April 1791 – 25 February 1861) was prime minister of the Kingdom of Sardinia from 21 February to 27 March 1848.

References

1791 births
1861 deaths
Prime ministers of the Kingdom of Sardinia
Grand Officiers of the Légion d'honneur